China Investment Bank was a defunct bank of China. It became a subsidiary of China Construction Bank in 1994. In 2018, it was absorbed by China Development Bank, with some business was received by China CITIC Bank.

References

Defunct banks of China